Birdy is the debut novel of William Wharton, who was more than 50 years old when it was published. It won the U.S. National Book Award in category First Novel. 
Birdy was a Pulitzer Prize finalist in 1980, ultimately losing to The Executioner's Song by Norman Mailer.

Birdy was adapted as a film of the same name, directed by Alan Parker and starring Matthew Modine and Nicolas Cage.

The novel has said to have been a lyrical influence on the song "The King of Birds" by American alternative rock band R.E.M.

Naomi Wallace, a poet and playwright, adapted Birdy for the stage in 1997.

References

1978 American novels
1978 debut novels
American novels adapted into films
National Book Award-winning works
Books about birds
Novels set in Philadelphia
Novels by William Wharton (author)
Alfred A. Knopf books
American novels adapted into plays